Kristen Thomson (born 1966) is a Canadian actress and playwright.

Thomson was born in Toronto, Ontario. She is known for her one-woman play I, Claudia, which was adapted to film in 2004. In that play and film, Thomson plays all of the roles, using masks to change character.

Thomson received her undergraduate training and University of Toronto's theatre school "University College Drama Program" currently under the tutelage of former Artistic Director of Factory Theatre's Ken Gass.

In 2003, Thomson won an ACTRA Award for her performance in I Shout Love (2001), a short film directed by Sarah Polley. She has also won three Dora Awards for her stage work. Her most recent win was for the Genie Award for Best Performance by an Actress in a Supporting Role in the movie Away From Her.

Filmography

Film

Television

External links

1966 births
Canadian women dramatists and playwrights
Canadian film actresses
Canadian stage actresses
Dora Mavor Moore Award winners
Best Supporting Actress Genie and Canadian Screen Award winners
Living people
Actresses from Toronto
Writers from Toronto
21st-century Canadian dramatists and playwrights
21st-century Canadian women writers
Best Supporting Actress in a Drama Series Canadian Screen Award winners
Canadian Comedy Award winners